Western Harnett High School is one of six high schools in Harnett County, North Carolina, United States. The other high schools include, Harnett Central, Triton, Overhills, the alternative school and Harnett Early College, located in Dunn, NC. WHHS is located approximately 11 miles southwest of Lillington, the county seat on N.C. Highway 27. The school was officially dedicated in May 1978, along with Harnett Central High School. The mascot for WHHS is the eagle.

History

Ground was broken for Western Harnett High School in October 1975.  Those present at this ceremony were Superintendent R. A. Gray, Harnett County Commissioners, and the three student council presents from the three high schools that would compose Western Harnett: Boone Trail, Benhaven, and Anderson Creek.  Construction on Western Harnett took two years.  The doors opened for students on September 7, 1977.  Ross Lane had been hired by HCS to be the first principal, but before the school year even started he left for another position.  Bob Beasley, principal at Angier High School was chosen to be the first principal at Western Harnett High School. He remained as principal until 1987 when he was elevated to the position of Assistant Superintendent of Harnett County Schools. Beasley was followed by Donny Hunter, 1987–1988; G Steve McNeill, 1988–1990; Henry Holt, 1990–1999; David Stewart, 1999–2000; David Pugh, 2000–2001; Jackie Samuels, 2001–2003; Terry Hinson, 2003–2008; William Wright, 2008–2011; Stan Williams, 2011–2013; Chris Pearson 2013–2018; Matthew Price 2018–2022; Ryan Mcneill 2022&present. 
In 2002, it was entered into U.S. Congressional testimony that Western Harnett had so increased size that 22 trailers were being used to accommodate the large student body. After swelling to more than 1,900 students in 2003–04, Overhills High School was opened to help accommodate the large number of students in the area, which encompassed the Anderson Creek and part of the Benhaven school district.

Demographics
Western Harnett is ethnically diverse, with about a fifth of the student population of black ethnicity, another fifth of Hispanic ethnicity and just over half of the student population of white ethnicity. About 9 percent of the student population participates in Advance Placement (AP) programs.

Notable alumni
 Eric Swann, former NFL defensive tackle and 2x All-Pro and Pro Bowl selection

References

External links 
 https://www.harnett.k12.nc.us/whhs

Public high schools in North Carolina
Buildings and structures in Harnett County, North Carolina
1978 establishments in North Carolina
Educational institutions established in 1978
Schools in Harnett County, North Carolina